Donghuashi Subdistrict is a subdistrict in the southeast part of Dongcheng, Beijing, China. As of 2020, it has 47,864 residents within its borders.

The subdistrict got its name from Donghuashi Dajie that is located with it.

History

Administrative Division 
As of 2021, the Donghuashi Subdistrict has the following 8 communities under its administration:

Landmarks 

 Beijing Ming City Wall Ruins Park

References 

Dongcheng District, Beijing
Subdistricts of Beijing